Torodora karsholti is a moth in the family Lecithoceridae. It was described by Kyu-Tek Park in 2002. It is found in Thailand.

The wingspan is 16–18 mm. The forewings have a dark fascia at the base and a small trapezoidal spot at the basal one-third of the costa. There is a well developed dark brown fascia near the basal one-third as well as two small dark discal spots at the upper and lower angle of the cell. There are about ten dark brown spots along the margin of the termen, from three-fourths of the costa to beyond the tornus. The hindwings are pale grey.

Etymology
The species is named in honour of Mr. Ole Karsholt, who collected the type specimen.

References

Moths described in 2002
Torodora
Moths of Asia